SRP may refer to:

Science and technology
 Scaling and root planing, in dentistry
 Signal recognition particle, in cell biology
 Spreading resistance profiling, for measuring semiconductor resistivity

Computing
 Secure Remote Password protocol, for authentication
 Server Routing Protocol, for BlackBerry
 Spatial Reuse Protocol, a Cisco networking protocol
 Stream Reservation Protocol, Ethernet enhancement
 Session Request Protocol, of USB On-The-Go
 Stack Resource Policy, a resource allocation policy
 SCSI RDMA Protocol, for transferring commands and data
 Synchronous reactive programming, a programming paradigm for reactive systems
 Single-responsibility principle, a programming principle (the S in SOLID)

Military
 Ship-submarine recycling program, a US Navy program
 Soldier Readiness Processing, a US Army program

Organizations
 Salt River Project, a utilities provider in Arizona, US
 Society for Radiological Protection, UK
 Sdruženie rasovo prenasledovaných (Association of Racially Persecuted People), which helped Holocaust survivors in Slovakia
 SRP Records, founded by Carl Sturken and Evan Rogers

Politics
 Sam Rainsy Party, the main opposition party in Cambodia
 Self-Defense of the Republic of Poland, a political party
 Socialist Labour Party of Croatia (Socijalistička radnička partija Hrvatske)
 Socialist Reich Party (Sozialistische Reichspartei), West Germany, banned in 1952

Other uses
 Suggested retail price
 Stord Airport, Sørstokken (IATA airport code), Norway
 Sports Racing Prototype, a car classification
 Shelf-ready packaging, for a product
 Service release premium, payment received by a lender on the sale of a closed mortgage loan
 South Road Properties, Cebu City, Philippines
 Serbian language (ISO 639-3 and ISO 639-2 code: srp)